NMD may refer to:
 No More Deaths, a humanitarian aid organization
 Norsk Medisinaldepot, a Norwegian pharmaceutics wholesaler
 National Masturbation Day
 National Missile Defense
 Neuromuscular disease
 New media
 Nonsense mediated decay, a mechanism of messenger RNA surveillance
 Northern Marianas descent
 Norwegian Maritime Directorate
 Naturopathic medical doctor
 Neuronal migration disorder